Henry Wills may refer to:

 Henry Wills (writer) (born 1930), British journalist, photographer and writer on local history and archaeology
 Henry Wills (Medal of Honor) (1842–?), United States Army soldier and Medal of Honor recipient
 Henry Herbert Wills (1856–1922), businessman and philanthropist from Bristol
 Henry Overton Wills III (1828–1911), Chancellor of the University of Bristol
 Henry Wills (actor)
 Henry Wills (MP)